"Freak Strike" is the third episode of the sixth season of the Comedy Central series South Park and the 82nd episode of the series overall. Going by production order, it is the 1st episode of Season 6 instead of the 3rd episode. It originally aired on March 20, 2002. In the episode, the boys disguise Butters as an individual with testicles on his chin, allowing him to win them a prize on a television show. However, Butters only wins a round of putt-putt golf. The freaks who make a career of appearing on TV talk shows go on strike, and make Butters strike with them.

Plot
The boys are watching an episode of Maury on which several children with bodily defects are shown.  A girl born with no midsection wins a gift certificate, so Kyle, Stan, Cartman, and Butters decide to try to get on the show with a faked deformity to win a prize. The group decide that Butters should be the one to go on the show with a scrotum on his chin. Butters then agrees, and the town's two sci-fi geeks make fake balls to put on Butters.

Butters then flies alone to New York to appear on the show. In the green room, he meets other variously deformed people, who welcome Butters to their union, which ensures that US TV talk shows interview their members regularly.

On the show, Maury introduces Butters as "Napoleon Bonaparte from South Park." Butters wins a trip to the largest miniature golf course in the world. Stan, Kyle, and Cartman are watching the show at home and become angry that Butters got "their" prize. Cartman calls Maury and tries to get himself on the show. The operator tells him they aren't currently interviewing people with deformities, but are trying to find "out of control kids" for a future episode. Cartman convinces his mom to take him on that show and lie that he's out of control.

Butters is grounded by his parents for putting fake deformity on the Maury show. The freaks strike in protest of Maury's decision to stop interviewing people with deformities, and head to Butters' house to recruit him. Fear of being discovered as a faker leads him to reluctantly agree, and he goes on strike with the group.

Cartman and his mom go on Maury. seeing a teenage girl's "out of control" behaviour, Cartman dresses up as a slutty girl to try to win the prize. The deformed people's union hijacks the TV studio's video screen and broadcasts a plea to the audience. They state that they are the "true" freaks and they should not lose their means of employment to people who are only freaks because they are "stupid trailer trash from the South". The union members present a music video about looking for the "True Freak Label" on talk shows, and most of the audience agrees and leave the studio. Maury agrees to negotiate with the deformed people. Cartman is irate that Butters once again ruined his chance to win a prize. He rips the fake balls off of Butters' chin. Butters fears he will be found out, but the union chases Cartman, who believe he was physically harming Butters. Butters' parents arrive in a taxi, and he knows he is in trouble again.

Production
The "True Freak Label" video sabotage that the freaks make Butters star in is a shot-by-shot parody of the International Ladies' Garment Workers' Union commercial from the '70s, which showed the workers singing a song known as "Look for the Union Label." According to the episode commentary, Parker and Stone were reminded of the commercial when viewing a bootlegged version of the Star Wars Holiday Special, which retained the commercial.

Home media
"Freak Strike," along with the sixteen other episodes from South Park: the Complete Sixth Season, were released on a three-disc DVD set in the United States on October 11, 2005. The sets include brief audio commentaries by Parker and Stone for each episode. IGN gave the season a rating of 9/10.

References

External links
 "Freak Strike" Full episode at South Park Studios
 

South Park (season 6) episodes
Television episodes set in New York City